YSES 2 b is an exoplanet orbiting the star YSES 2 (TYC 8984-2245-1) in the constellation of Musca. It was discovered through direct imaging by Bohn et al. in 2021. The planet is unusually far from its young host star. 

Its year is 1176.5 Earth years, and its semi-major axis is 114 AU. Its mass is  Jupiter masses, its radius is unknown, and its temperature is unknown.

YSES 2, the host star, is a young, Sun-like star. It is approximately 360 ly from Earth in Scorpius-Centaurus Association. Its age is 14 million years.

References 

Gas giants
Exoplanets detected by direct imaging
Exoplanets discovered in 2021
Musca (constellation)
Scorpius–Centaurus association